The Costa Rica Open is a men's professional golf tournament that was played annually in Costa Rica until 2007. It was an event on the Tour de las Americas from 2002 until its replacement by the Costa Rica Golf Classic in 2008, and was also co-sanctioned by the European Challenge Tour from 2003.

The tournament was held at the Cariari Country Club near San José every year except in 2004 when it was played over the Valle del Sol Golf Course near Santa Ana. The 2006 event was renamed in order to pay tribute to the tournaments founder and promoter, Kai Fieberg, who had been killed in a car accident earlier in the year.

In 1979 and 1980, Cariari hosted the PGA sponsored Friendship Cup, which is sometimes also referred to as the Costa Rica Open. These tournaments were won by Raymond Floyd and Larry Ziegler.

Winners

Notes

References

External links
Official coverage on the Challenge Tour's official site

Golf tournaments in Costa Rica
Former Challenge Tour events
Former Tour de las Américas events